Medu vada is a South Indian breakfast snack made from Vigna mungo (black lentil). It is usually made in a doughnut shape, with a crispy exterior and soft interior. A popular food item in South Indian cuisine it is generally eaten as a breakfast or a snack.

Etymology 

"Medu" is the Malayalam, Kannada and Tamil  word for "soft"; "medu vada" thus literally means "soft fritter". The dish is often mentioned simply as "vada" on menus  or as uddina vade Kannada, urad vada, medhu vadai, ulundu vadai (Tamil), garelu (Telugu), uzhunnu vada (Malayalam), and batuk (Nepali).

History 

According to Vir Sanghvi, the origin of medu vada can be traced with "some certainty" to the Maddur town in present-day Karnataka. The dish was made popular outside South India by Udupi restaurateurs of Mumbai.

Preparation 
The medu vada is made primarily of black lentils (urad dal) batter. The black lentils are soaked in water for several hours, and then ground to a paste. The paste may be flavoured with other ingredients such as asafoetida, methi seeds (fenugreek), ginger, cumin seeds, black pepper, curry leaves, chillies and coconut pieces. It is then patted into doughnut-shapes and fried in oil until golden brown.

One variation involves baking instead of frying. Other variations of the dish involve use of pulses other than black lentils. For example, am-bada (or aama vadai) is made with chana dal (split chickpea lentil); occasionally, tuar (pigeon pea) and masoor (lentil) are also used.

Serving 
The dish is usually served with sambar (lentil and vegetable stew) and coconut chutney. Along with idli, it is often eaten as a breakfast. It is also eaten as a lunch starter or a snack.

The medu vada is sometimes also served with yogurt, as a chaat snack (see dahi vada).

In Nepal, on the day of Maghe Sankranti, people make , which is eaten with a variety of boiled tubers such as yam, taro, and sweet potato. Batuk is a traditional festive delicacy of both the Magar and Khas communities of Nepal. Magar people prepare batuk on Maghi, a New Year festival celebrated on the same day of Maghe Sankranti. Magars also eat batuk during weddings, where the groom's family presents batuk to the bride's family alongside pig meat, alcohol, and sel roti. Newa people of Kathmandu valley have their own version of batuks, known as bara. Tharu people in the southern part of west Nepal also make black lentil fritters known as bariya but it is flat or ball-shaped.

Gallery

See also

 List of deep fried foods
 List of Nepalese dishes
 List of Indian dishes
 List of doughnut varieties
 List of fried dough varieties

References

External links

 Medu Vada, South Indian Vada, Daal Vada . About.com.

Indian snack foods
South Indian cuisine
Sri Lankan snack food
Sinhalese New Year foods
Fritters
Nepalese cuisine